Russian Hockey Federation may refer to

 Russian Field Hockey Federation
 Ice Hockey Federation of Russia
 Russian Bandy Federation (in Russia, bandy is also called "Russian hockey")